The Iona Community, founded in 1938 by George MacLeod, is an ecumenical Christian community of men and women from different walks of life and different traditions within Christianity.

It and its publishing house, Wild Goose Publications, are headquartered in Glasgow, Scotland, and its activities take place on the island of Iona, Mull, in Argyll and Bute and Glasgow.

History
The community began as a project led by George MacLeod, a minister of the Church of Scotland in Govan, Glasgow, to close the gap which he perceived between the church and working people. He took a group of ministers and working men to Iona to rebuild the ruined medieval Iona Abbey together. The community which grew out of this was initially under the supervision of an Iona Community Board reporting to the General Assembly of the Church of Scotland, but later the formal links with the Church of Scotland were loosened to allow the community more scope for ecumenical involvement.

The community appealed for funds to renovate the abbey leading to its re-opening, attended by Princess Anne, patron of the appeal, after a three-year closure in June 2021. The project was blessed by the "Miracle in May", when fundraising in May obtained the £300,000 needed to keep contractors working. The re-opening was featured in Songs of Praise. 24 June 2021

Community life and activities
The Iona Community is a dispersed community. It has members who work and live throughout the world. There are 270 Full Members, around 1,800 Associate Members and 1,600 Friends of the Community. Among them are Presbyterians, Anglicans, Lutherans, Quakers, Roman Catholics and people of no denominational allegiance. The community has a strong commitment to ecumenism and to peace and justice issues.

The Iona Community runs three residential centres: Iona Abbey and the MacLeod Centre on the island of Iona, and Camas Tuath on Mull. Weeks at the centres often follow a programme related to the concerns of the Iona Community, and people are invited to come and share the life. A regular feature of a visit to Iona is a pilgrimage around the island which includes meditations on discipleship; when the pilgrims reach the disused marble quarry or the machair, the common ground where the crofters once grazed sheep, for example, they stop for reflection on work and faithfulness.

The community has its own ecumenical liturgy which is used daily in the abbey and elsewhere.

Speaking about the visitor experience, Ruth Harvey, leader of the community, said: "This is not a hotel or a conference centre. People come for reflection and inspiration, and to explore issues of importance – the environment, poverty, migration, equality – in the context of a Christian community and in a beautiful, rugged landscape."

Worship
Amongst the most widely known song and liturgical material from the Iona Community is the experimental worship developed by the Wild Goose Resource Group, based in Glasgow. The Group exists to enable and equip congregations and clergy in the shaping and creation of new forms of relevant and participative worship, particularly concerned with enabling John Bell, Graham Maule and Jo Love supported by a small administrative team led by Gail Ullrich.

Bell and Maule, with their collaborators, the Wild Goose Worship Group and more recently, the Wild Goose Collective, have produced around 50 published books and CDs since the mid-1980s. In the 1980s and 1990s, the Wild Goose Worship Group was influential in introducing songs from other cultures (particularly those from South Africa) to the repertoire of churches in the UK and elsewhere.

The approaches and practices of the Wild Goose Resource Group have been widely imitated and written about. Collections of Wild Goose Resource Group songs and texts have been published internationally, including translations into Swedish, Norwegian, Finnish, Japanese, Dutch, West Frisian, Danish and German.

Leaders and notable members
The leader of the community is elected by the members. The leaders to date are:
 George MacLeod 1938-1967
 Ian Reid 1967-1974
 Graeme Brown 1974-1981
 Ron Ferguson 1982-1988
 John Harvey 1988-1995
 Norman Shanks 1995-2002
 Kathy Galloway 2002-2009
 Peter MacDonald 2009-2017
 Michael Marten 2017
 Kathy Galloway and Caro Smyth 2017-2018
 Kathy Galloway and Christian MacLean 2018-2020
 Ruth Harvey, since 2020

Notable Members 
Bruce Kenrick, the founder of housing organisation Shelter, was a member.

Maxwell Craig, first general secretary of Action of Churches Together in Scotland (ACTS), was a member.

Douglas Haldane (1926-2012), child psychiatrist was a member of the community.

Helen Steven, was Justice and Peace Worker for the Iona Community from 1979 to 1985.

John Bell, hymn-writer and Church of Scotland minister, is a member of the Iona Community.

Graham Maule (1958-2019), youth leader and founder member of the Wild Goose Resource Group, was a member.

Non-binary minister Alex Clare-Young is a member and the moderator of the Community's LGBTQ+ Common Concern Network.

Alison Phipps,  first UNESCO Chair in Refugee Integration through Languages and the Arts and at Glasgow University is a member.

Miles Christi
Miles Christi was a name given to the members of the Iona Community by its founder George MacLeod. The origin of this image of being a Soldier for Christ may have its roots in Martin of Tours who as a former Roman soldier applied similar discipline to Christian life and was a great inspiration to the early Church in Scotland. St Martin's Cross, a high Celtic Cross carved in stone, stands to this day outside the entrance to the Church of Iona Abbey. The image also reflects a tradition of someone remaining on watch. The early Christian Community on Iona founded by St Columba sent members out to evangelise mainland Scotland and beyond, with some members remaining behind. George MacLeod had been a decorated soldier in the First World War. He founded the Iona Community just before the outbreak of the Second World War.

Publishing activities
The community's publishing group, Wild Goose Publications, produces books on social justice, political and peace issues, holistic spirituality, healing, and innovative approaches to worship, including music (books, tapes, CDs), short drama scripts and material for personal reflection and group discussion. Many of these are the work of John L. Bell and the Wild Goose Resource Group.

See also
 New Monasticism related Communities
 Servants to Asia's Urban Poor
 Madonna House Apostolate
 Catholic Worker Movement
 Bose Monastic Community
 Taizé Community
 Monastic Fraternities of Jerusalem

References

Further reading
 Ron Ferguson, George MacLeod: Founder of the Iona Community — A Biography Wild Goose Publications, 1990. 
 Ron Ferguson, Chasing the Wild Goose: The Story of the Iona Community Wild Goose Publications, new revised edition 1998. 
 Norman Shanks, Iona - God's Energy: The Vision and Spirituality of the Iona Community Wild Goose Publications, new revised edition 2009. 
 Anne Muir, Outside the Safe Place: An oral history of the early years of the Iona Community Wild Goose Publications, 2011.

External links
 Iona Community
 Wild Goose Resource Group
 Wild Goose Publications,
 Die Gemeinschaft von Iona in Deutschland
 The Iona Community in the USA

Christian organizations established in 1938
Church of Scotland
Organisations based in Glasgow
Community
Nondenominational Christian societies and communities
Christian organisations based in Scotland
Govan
1938 establishments in Scotland
Intentional communities in the United Kingdom